Kajsa is a Swedish feminine given name. Initially, Kajsa, Kaisa or Cajsa was a variation of the name Karin, in turn a variation of the name Katarina (Catherine). It is known in Sweden since 1540. It is also used in Finland and Norway. 

Notable people with the name include:

Halta-Kajsa (1792–1857), Swedish story teller
Kajsa Bergqvist (born 1976), Swedish high jumper
Kajsa Bergström (born 1981), Swedish curler
Kajsa Ekis Ekman (born 1980), Swedish journalist and writer
Kajsa Ernst (born 1962), Swedish actress
Kajsa Grytt (born 1961), Swedish musician
Kajsa Kling (born 1988), Swedish alpine skier
Kajsa Nilsson (born 1982), Swedish orienteer
Kajsa Norman (1820–1903), Swedish folk musician
Kajsa Ollongren (born 1967), Dutch-Swedish politician
Kajsa Reingardt (born 1957), Swedish actress
Kaisa Pöyry (1818-1892), Finnish cunning woman and herbalist
Kajsa Rinaldo Persson (born 1997), Swedish tennis player
Kajsa Thoor (1971–2023), Swedish journalist and television presenter 
Kajsa Wahlberg, Swedish police official
Cajsa Wahllund (1771-1843), Swedish-born Finnish restaurateur
Cajsa Warg (1703-1769), Swedish cookbook author

Fictitious figures
Kajsa Anka, Swedish name for Daisy Duck
Ysätters-Kajsa, legendary creature in Swedish folklore
Kajsa Kavat, story by Swedish writer Astrid Lindgren, named after the main character

See also
Kaisa (name)

Swedish feminine given names